The 2007 Rink Hockey World Championship was the 38th edition of the Rink Hockey World Championship, being held between 16 and 23 June 2007, in Montreux, Switzerland. It was disputed by 16 countries and it watched Spain achieving his 13th title, after an 8–1 win over Switzerland, in the final. The event marked the first time Switzerland reached the final of the most important international roller hockey competition. It also marked the worst performance ever for Portugal, with a disappointing 6th place.

Format

The competition was disputed by 16 countries, divided in four groups of 4 teams each one. Unsurprisingly, the four major National Teams, Portugal, Spain, Italy and Argentina were divided by the four groups and they all won them. The two highest classified teams of each group would qualify for the knockout phase, starting with the quarter-finals. The winners would face each other at the semi-finals and then would advance for the final. The losers played for the 3rd place award.

Every game lasted 40 minutes, divided in 2 parts of 20 minutes.

Phase I

Group A

Group B

Group C

Group D

Knockout Phase

Bracket

5th–8th places

9th–12th places

13th–16th places

 ET: Extra-Time
 GP: Penalties

Final Placing

External links

Roller Hockey World Cup
World Championship
Rink Hockey World Championship
Rink Hockey World Championship